West 11 is a 1963 British crime film directed by Michael Winner and starring Alfred Lynch, Kathleen Breck, Eric Portman, Diana Dors, and Kathleen Harrison. It is based on The Furnished Room (1961), Laura Del-Rivo's debut novel, which was adapted for the screen by Willis Hall and Keith Waterhouse. Set in west London, the title is taken from the postcode W11, and it was filmed on location in Notting Hill.
In 2021 it was digitally restored and released on DVD.

Plot
In Notting Hill's jazz club, coffee bar and bedsit land of the early 1960s, Joe Beckett is a young unemployed misfit and drifter whose life takes a turn for the worse when he encounters Richard Dyce, an ex-army officer. Dyce persuades Beckett it will be in his interests to bump off Dyce's wealthy aunt for her money. Beckett travels to the old lady's house on the South coast, and prepares to murder her but loses his nerve and in a struggle, accidentally pushes her down a flight of stairs, killing her anyway. After a witness reports him, Beckett returns to his digs and finds the police waiting for him. Dyce denies all involvement and Beckett turns himself in.

Cast
 Alfred Lynch as Joe Beckett
 Kathleen Breck as Ilsa Barnes
 Eric Portman as Richard Dyce
 Diana Dors as Georgia
 Kathleen Harrison as Mrs. Beckett
 Finlay Currie as Mr. Cash
 Freda Jackson as Mrs. Hartley
 Peter Reynolds as Jacko
 Harold Lang as Silent
 Marie Ney as Mildred Dyce
 Sean Kelly as Larry
 Patrick Wymark as Father Hogan
 Ken Colyer as Ken Collyer, Band Leader
 Allan McClelland as Mr. Royce
 Francesca Annis as Phyl
 Brian Wilde as Speaker
 David Hemmings as young hoodlum (uncredited)
 Larry Dann as young hoodlum (uncredited)
 Damaris Hayman as Country House Guide (uncredited)
 Norman Mitchell as Shop customer (uncredited)

Production
The film was based on the novel The Furnished Room by Laura Del-Rivo which was published in 1961.

In 1962, it was announced the film version would be made by Associated British starring Claudia Cardinale and directed by Joseph Losey. The job of directing eventually went to Michael Winner, who had made a number of low-budget movies including Play It Cool. Winner said the film "had been turned down by a lot of people" and producer Danny Angel had "just sacked Joseph Losey because he was going to turn it into a film that Mr. Angel didn’t like. I’m sure it would have been a very good film. He offered it to me because I was around. I took it with both hands. It wasn’t a perfect script but it was far better than Play It Cool."

Michael Winner wanted to cast Sean Connery, Oliver Reed, Julie Christie and James Mason but says the producer overruled him. Winner used Reed in his next movie, The System. Winner later said:
We had Sarah Miles who  left at short notice. At the time Julie Christie was under contract to Rank. She’d done some bad comedies but I always thought she was marvellous. The producer didn’t even want to test her because she’d been tested for a great many films and been rejected, including Billy Liar which she was later taken for because the girl who was chosen became ill. And we tested her and I immediately said: 'This is marvellous, we’ve discovered a very, very big star'. The producer turned to me and said: 'You’re absolutely mad, she’s a B picture actress and she’ll- never be anything else'. There were seven people in the room, including the casting department of A.B.C., the Associate Producer and various other hangers on. They all concurred with the Producer — except one fellow, an A.B.C. casting assistant. Also for the same film I wanted to use Oliver Reed and the producer wouldn’t consider having him because he said he was a B picture actor too.
Michael Winner said Angel "turned down Sean Connery for the other lead because he, too, was a B-picture actor, and James Mason for the villain because he was past it. We ended up with Alfred Lynch (an excellent actor but not Sean Connery), Kathleen Breck (an excellent actress but not Julie Christie) and Eric Portman, who was so good I didn't mind."

Diana Dors returned from Los Angeles where she was then living to make the movie.

Critical reception
Decades later, the Radio Times reviewer wrote: "Michael Winner's skirmish with British social realism shows what life was like in the bedsits of Notting Hill, years before Julia Roberts showed up. The script is mostly a series of loosely connected sketches, though the film's sole virtue nowadays is the location camerawork of Otto Heller that captures the then peeling and shabbily converted Regency houses that were riddled with dry rot and Rachmanism, which exchanged squalor for extortionate rents. Stanley Black and Acker Bilk's music adds a cloying note to a movie that rarely rises above basement level"; but Variety observed that "it has its merits. The sleazy London locations are very authentically shown. Perhaps too authentically."

External links

West 11 at Letterbox DVD
West 11 at Reel Streets

References

1963 films
1963 crime films
Films shot at Associated British Studios
1960s English-language films
Films directed by Michael Winner
British crime films
1960s British films